Tatyana Titova (born 8 May 1967) is a former synchronised swimmer from the Soviet Union. She competed in the women's duet competitions at the 1988 Summer Olympics gaining a 6th place.

Titova was born in Moscow and graduated from the State Central Order of Lenin Institute of Physical Education. She married the renowned Soviet and Russian water polo player Dmitry Apanasenko and changed her last name to Apanasenko.

References

External links
 
Profile at Infosport.ru 

1967 births
Living people
Swimmers from Moscow
Soviet synchronized swimmers
Olympic synchronized swimmers of the Soviet Union
Synchronized swimmers at the 1988 Summer Olympics
Russian State University of Physical Education, Sport, Youth and Tourism alumni